Vadym Stepanovych Kharchenko (born 7 December 1975, Perevalsk, Luhansk Oblast, Ukrainian SSR) is a Ukrainian football midfielder who played in the Ukrainian Premier League. He retired from playing in 2010.

References

External links 

1975 births
Living people
People from Perevalsk
Ukrainian footballers
FC Metalist Kharkiv players
FC Naftovyk-Ukrnafta Okhtyrka players
FC Viktor Zaporizhzhia players
FC Metalist-2 Kharkiv players
FC Spartak Sumy players
FC Poltava players
Association football midfielders
Sportspeople from Luhansk Oblast